Sean Ryan (born 23 August 1973) is an Australian former professional rugby league footballer who played in the 1980s and 1990s. He played for the Cronulla-Sutherland Sharks in the Australian National Rugby League (NRL) competition and Hull F.C. and the Castleford Tigers (Heritage № 806) in the Super League.

Footnotes

References
 

1973 births
Living people
Australian rugby league players
Castleford Tigers players
Cronulla-Sutherland Sharks players
Hull F.C. players
New South Wales rugby league team players
Rugby league second-rows